Nabil El Zhar (born 27 August 1986) is a professional footballer who plays for Muaither as a right winger.

He finished his formation at Liverpool, playing sparingly for the club and more consistently on loan at PAOK in 2010–11. He then moved to Spain, spending four La Liga seasons at Levante.

El Zhar earned 10 international caps for Morocco from 2008 to 2014.

Club career

Youth
Born in Alès, Gard, El Zhar began his football career with OAC Alès, a local youth team. From there he moved to Nîmes Olympique, then switched again to AS Saint-Étienne.

Liverpool
He signed for Liverpool in October 2006 and made his debut for their reserve team against Newcastle in a reserves match on 3 October 2006.

El Zhar made his first team debut on 29 November 2006 in goalless draw against Portsmouth at Anfield, replacing Luis García after 72 minutes. He went on to make two more appearances in the 2006–07 season.

He made his first Liverpool start in a League Cup tie against Cardiff City on 31 October 2007, in which he scored his first goal for the club in a 2–1 home win. El Zhar was moved from the number 42 shirt to the number 31 shirt for the start of the 2008–09 campaign.

El Zhar contributed a first assist on 18 October 2008, coming on for Andrea Dossena with his team 2–1 down against Wigan Athletic. He set up Albert Riera for the equaliser and the game finished 3–2 to Liverpool. On 27 February 2009, he made his first league start for the Reds against Middlesbrough in a 2–0 loss.

On 11 July 2009, he signed a new contract extension to his current Liverpool contract that would have kept him at Anfield until 2012.

Loan to PAOK
On 31 August 2010, El Zhar completed a loan switch to Greek side PAOK FC for the upcoming season and was handed the number 7 shirt on his arrival. He made his debut for the club on 16 September in a 1–1 UEFA Europa League group game against Club Brugge, and featured in all five other matches in the group, as the team lost in the last 32 to PFC CSKA Moscow.

El Zhar played 24 matches as the club from Thessaloniki came fourth in the league, scoring in a 2–2 away draw with Atromitos F.C. and a 2–1 victory over Panathinaikos F.C. at the Toumba Stadium.

Levante
On 18 August 2011, Liverpool announced that El Zhar had been released from his contract and that he was expected to complete a move to Spanish side Levante UD where he would sign a contract to keep him at the Estadi Ciutat de València for two years. He made his La Liga debut ten days later, coming on as a substitute for Pedro López in a 1–1 away draw against Getafe CF. He made 22 appearances across the campaign for the team from Valencia, as they came sixth and qualified for the UEFA Europa League.

El Zhar scored his first goal in the main category of Spanish football on 19 August 2012, netting the first in a 1–1 home draw against Atlético Madrid. Four days later, he came off the bench at Fir Park in a European play-off, and scored the conclusive goal in a 2–0 win over Motherwell. On 26 October 2013, he netted twice in a 4–0 home win over RCD Espanyol.

On 26 August 2015, he rescinded his contract with the Granotes.

Las Palmas
Hours after rescinding with Levante, El Zhar signed a two-year deal with UD Las Palmas, newly promoted to the top tier. He made his debut on 30 August, a late substitute as his new team hosted a goalless draw with his previous employer. On 6 December, he recorded his first goal for the team from the Canary Islands, equalising in a 3–1 loss at Sporting de Gijón.

Leganés
On 31 January 2017, El Zhar signed a one-and-a-half-year contract at CD Leganés, halfway through their debut top-flight season.

Al Ahli
On 30 May 2019, El Zhar agreed to join Qatari club Al Ahli SC.

International career
Although born in  France, El Zhar chose to play internationally for the country of his parents, Morocco. However, he did represent France at youth level. El Zhar played in the 2005 FIFA World Youth Championship, and Morocco got to the semi-finals, where they were defeated 3–0 by Nigeria. Morocco ended the tournament in fourth place after a 2–1 loss to Brazil.

On 26 March 2008, made his full international debut for Morocco against Belgium at the Stade Roi Baudouin;  he came on at half time in place of Youssouf Hadji and scored in a 4–1 victory. That 21 June, he scored his first competitive goal for the Lions of the Atlas, concluding a 2–0 win over Rwanda in qualification for the 2010 FIFA World Cup.

References

External links
 
 
 LFChistory.net player profile
 
 

1986 births
Living people
People from Alès
French sportspeople of Moroccan descent
French expatriate sportspeople in England
French expatriate sportspeople in Spain
French expatriate sportspeople in Greece
French footballers
Moroccan footballers
Association football forwards
Nîmes Olympique players
AS Saint-Étienne players
Premier League players
Liverpool F.C. players
Super League Greece players
PAOK FC players
La Liga players
Qatar Stars League players
Qatari Second Division players
Levante UD footballers
UD Las Palmas players
CD Leganés players
Al Ahli SC (Doha) players
Muaither SC players
Morocco international footballers
Moroccan expatriate footballers
Expatriate footballers in England
Expatriate footballers in Greece
Expatriate footballers in Spain
Expatriate footballers in Qatar
Morocco under-20 international footballers
Moroccan expatriate sportspeople in England
Moroccan expatriate sportspeople in Spain
Moroccan expatriate sportspeople in Qatar
France youth international footballers
Sportspeople from Gard
Moroccan expatriate sportspeople in Greece
Footballers from Occitania (administrative region)